Cricket Club of India (CCI) is a cricket club in India. It is located on Dinsha Wacha Road, in Churchgate of Mumbai, India. It was conceived as India's counterpart to the Marylebone Cricket Club (MCC). It is considered one of the most prestigious clubs in the nation. The CCI uses the Brabourne Stadium for cricket games. It is affiliated to the Board of Control for Cricket in India.

Membership is the same as for the Royal Willingdon Sports Club, Bombay Gymkhana and Breach Candy Club: closed, and only current members' children can attain it.

History

On 8 November 1933, the Cricket Club of India was incorporated as a company limited by guarantee with its registered office in New Delhi. The principal object of the company was to promote sports in general and cricket in particular throughout the country.

The promoters and some leading men who founded BCCI  five years before were the promoters of the Club.  Originally, life members, who were later termed as founder members, paid Rs 100 and ordinary members paid Rs 10 for entrance and an annual subscription of Rs 15.

The Cricket Club of India was also the birthplace of the famous Chinese-style dish Chicken Manchurian. Restaurateur Nelson Wang claims to have invented it at the request of a customer in 1975 while working as a cook at the CCI. 

BCCI's headquarters were within the CCI until 2007 when it was moved to its current location at the Cricket centre in the premises of Mumbai Cricket Association at the Wankhede stadium. Brabourne Stadium served as the primary home ground of the Mumbai cricket team until the construction of the Wankhede Stadium in 1974.

First-class cricket
Teams representing the Cricket Club of India played 13 first-class matches between 1935 and 1958, most of them against touring teams. Nine of the matches were played at Brabourne Stadium.

Facilities

The CCI also houses in the Brabourne Stadium, which the club owns. The CCI is an affiliated member of the BCCI like any other state association, but unlike any one of them, does not conduct cricket in the state. 
Mumbai Cricket Association, Maharashtra Cricket Association and Vidarbha Cricket Association conduct cricket in Mumbai and rest of Maharashtra respectively. The stadium has one of the best cricket pitches and grounds in the region. It also has tennis courts, a swimming pool, fitness centers, a billiards room, squash courts, badminton courts, table tennis tables, cafes, bars, a library, a reading room and a banquet hall. It is very difficult to get membership into this exclusive club.

Kingfisher Open 

In 2006 and 2007, the CCI tennis courts hosted the Kingfisher Airlines Tennis Open, an ATP Tour tournament, previously held in Shanghai from 1995 to 2004 and in Vietnam in 2005. Kingfisher Airlines were the official sponsors. The tournament was presented by the Government of Maharashtra, India. The tournament was played from 25 September 2006 to 2 October 2006.

ICC Champions trophy
The Cricket Club of India Limited staged 5 matches of the ICC Champions Trophy in 2006 including the final between Australia and West Indies played on 5 November 2006.

2013 ICC Women's world cup
The Brabourne Stadium hosted the 2013 Women's Cricket World Cup along with the MIG Cricket club in Bandra, Mumbai, the DREIMS ground and the Barabati Stadium both in Cuttack. The Brabourne Stadium hosted the final of the event, where Australia comprehensively beat the West Indies.

Membership scam
In 2013 an internal inquiry set up by the club concluded that at least 11 members had got into the 80-year-old institution in the last three years through forgery committed in collusion with a club insider. Several CCI members revealed that the fraud was committed by replacing personal details of certain deceased members with those of these new entrants. "Files of certain members who had died some time back and whose files were lying dormant were tampered with by someone on the inside who had access," said a source close to the investigation, who did not wish to be identified. "Names and other details of aspiring members were then put in the old files to make it look as if the old member (deceased) never existed in the club records."

The Economic Offences Wing (EOW) of the Mumbai police arrested two businessmen, Ketan Thacker and Nimai Agrawal, in connection with the fake memberships scam.

References

External links
 Official website

Indian club cricket teams
Indian first-class cricket teams
Tennis venues in India
Cricket in Mumbai
1933 establishments in India
Sports organizations established in 1933
Sports clubs in Mumbai